Bukunmi Oluwasina  is a Nigerian actress, producer, screenwriter and singer. Her awards include the 2015 Best Actress of the Year award from the Best of Nollywood Awards for her film Ayomi.

Early life and education
Bukunmi Oluwasina born to the family of seven, hails from Okemesi-Ekiti. She holds a bachelor's degree in Theatre Arts from Obafemi Awolowo University.

Career
Oluwasina produced the movie Ayomi in 2015, which got nominated at the  Africa Magic Viewer's Choice Awards and won Best of Nollywood Awards. In 2021, she became the first Nollywood actress to act four different character roles in the movie titled Jankariwo.

Personal life
She married her longtime boyfriend, Mr Ebun, in September 2020. They announced the birth of their first child on March 3, 2021.

Filmography
Story Like Mine
Oluwere
Itan temi
Beautiful Song
Ayomi
Jankariwo (2021)
Citation
Soole

Discography
Happy Girl
Everyday Crush
Kurukuru
Eiye Adaba

Awards and nomination

References

External links

Living people
Yoruba actresses
Nigerian film actresses
Nigerian women writers
Nigerian film award winners
Actresses in Yoruba cinema
Nigerian screenwriters
People from Ekiti State
Obafemi Awolowo University alumni
Nigerian women singers
Nigerian film producers
Year of birth missing (living people)